Samalkha is a town and Sub district of Panipat district that has its own tehsil as well as a municipal committee located in Indian state of Haryana. It is center of politics in Haryana after Sohna in gurugram and Faridabad.

Industries in the town include cast iron, nuts and bolts, iron rods machine tools and bathroom fittings manufacture. There are about 82 villages in Samalkha block and 17 wards.  Main villages are Bapoli,  Sanauli, Chulkana, Patti kalyana,  Jaurassi, Kiwana, Manana and Naraina.

Geography

Connectivity
National Highway 44 (India) is a major road network that connects Samalkha to Grand Trunk road network.

Some of villages (like- Hathwala, Bilaspur, etc) of Samalkha are also connected to UP through the Yamuna River.

Samalkha is connected to all major Indian cities via Samalkha railway station

Demographics
According to the 2011 India census, Samalkha had a population of 39,710. Males are 21,379 and females are 18,331. Samalkha has an average literacy rate of 78%, higher than the national average of 61.5%: male literacy is 78%, and female literacy is 69%. In Samalkha, 20% of the population is under 6 years of age.

Samalkha town is inhabited by outsiders mainly vaishyas, Punjabis and local jats.

Market
Samalkha takes the position of ward no. 5 in Panipat. It is in possession of large grain, jaggery and wood markets, one of the largest markets is located in the state of Haryana. The market stretches for 1 km from the old bus stand/GT road to the railway station and features prominent companies in the polymer and bath fitting industries. It also receives a high influx of customers from neighboring districts like Baghpat or Uttar Pradesh.

Industries
 Nestlé India Ltd, situated on Patikalyana-Kiwana Road.
 Continental Warehousing Corporation NS Ltd. D P WORLD Group, situated on NH 1 at Diwana, Haryana
 Haryana Organics Bear Factory, situated on Chulkana-Samalkha Road
 Jai Hind Iron Foundry, situated on GT Road Samalkha
 Shri Tirupati Steels, situated on HSIIDC Road Samalkha
 Bharat Trading Company, Shop No.155 situated in New Grain Market Samalkha.

Colleges
 Gandhi Adrash College, Chulkana Road
 Vaish Girls College, Samalkha
 Tau Devi Lal College of Education, Manana
 Samalkha Group of Institutions, Hathwala Road
 Panipat Institute of Engineering and Technology, near Pattikalyana, N.H. 44
 Geeta Institute of law,Karhans

Politics 
Samalkha's politics is very complex. Samalkha is Gurjar dominant legislative constituency.Since many years only a Gurjar community candidate was winning the MLA election, but this record was broken by Ravindra Machrouli of Non Gurjar community in 2014. In 2019 election a Gurjar community candidate named Dharam Singh Chhoker won the elections who previously also served as the MLA of Samalkha from 2009-2014.

References

Cities and towns in Panipat district